HD 187420 (HR 7548; 71 G. Telescopii) and HD 187421 (HR 7549; 72 G. Telescopii), are the components of a binary star located in the southern constellation Telescopium. Gaia DR3 parallax measurements place the stars at a distance of 407 and 414 light years respectively.

The system
HD 187420 is the primary of the system. It has an apparent magnitude of 5.71, making it faintly visible to the naked eye as a yellowish-orange-hued star. However, its brightness is diminished by 0.17 magnitudes due to interstellar dust. Meanwhile, the secondary HD 187421 has an apparent magnitude of 6.37, placing it near the limit for naked eye visibility. It too suffers from extinction, which makes it 0.25 magnitudes dimmer. The stars have absolute magnitudes of −0.33 and +2.69 respectively. HD 187421 is located 23.5" away from HD 187420 along a position angle of 148° as of 2016. They were first observed as a double star in 1826 by astronomer James Dunlap.

HD 187420
HD 187420 has a stellar classification of G8/K0 III, indicating that it is an evolved star with the characteristics of a G8 and K0 giant star. It has 3 times the mass of the Sun but at the age of 377 million years, it has expanded to 11.6 times the radius of the Sun.

HD 187421
HD 187421 is an A-type star with the characteristics of an A1 and A3 main sequence star, which corresponds to a classification of A1/3 V. It has 2.31 times the mass of the Sun and 2.72 times the Sun's radius. HD 187421 is particularly metal enriched at [Fe/H] = +0.2 and is estimated to be 560 million years old.

References

G-type giants
K-type giants
A-type main-sequence stars
Binary stars
Telescopium (constellation)
Telescopii, 71 72
CD-55 08312 08313
187420 187421
097816 097819
7548 7549